Fritz Hofmann (Friedrich Carl Albert) (2 November 1866 in Kölleda – 22 October 1956 in Hanover) was a German organic chemist who first synthesized synthetic rubber.

Hofmann studied chemistry in Rostock. On September 12, 1909, he filed a patent for the manufacture of the world's first synthetic rubber.

Honors
In 1912, Hofmann received the Emil Fischer Medal from the German Chemical Society for his research on synthetic rubber.

See also
Sergei Vasiljevich Lebedev

References

External links
 

Organic chemists
20th-century German chemists
20th-century German inventors
University of Rostock alumni
Humboldt University of Berlin alumni
Polymer scientists and engineers
Commanders Crosses of the Order of Merit of the Federal Republic of Germany
1866 births
1956 deaths
Bayer people